The women's shot put event  at the 1978 European Athletics Indoor Championships was held on 12 March in Milan.

Results

References

Shot put at the European Athletics Indoor Championships
Shot
Euro